Charles N. McCollum (February 8, 1852 – September 21, 1937) was an American politician. He served in the South Dakota State Senate from 1889 to 1890. He also sat in the Dakota Territory Legislature from 1881 to 1882.

References

1852 births
1937 deaths
People from Vienna, Missouri
People from Springfield, South Dakota
Members of the Dakota Territorial Legislature
19th-century American politicians
Democratic Party South Dakota state senators